Stoer Head (Rubha Stoer in Scots Gaelic) is a point of land north of Lochinver and the township of Stoer in Sutherland, NW Scotland. The lighthouse on the point marks the northern entrance to The Minch.

References

Headlands of Scotland
Landforms of Sutherland
Landforms of Highland (council area)